Gartree could refer to

Gartree (HM Prison), a Category B men's  prison located in Market Harborough, Leicestershire 
Gartree Hundred, a wapentake and later a hundred of Leicestershire, England
Gartree High School, a Secondary School in Leicester
Gartree (Lincolnshire), a wapentake of Lincolnshire
Gartree, County Antrim, a townland in County Antrim, Northern Ireland